Arnold Walfisz (2 July 1892 – 29 May 1962) was a Jewish-Polish mathematician working in analytic number theory.

Life 
After the Abitur in Warsaw (Poland), Arnold Walfisz studied (1909−14 and 1918−21) in Germany at Munich, Berlin, Heidelberg and Göttingen. Edmund Landau was his doctoral-thesis supervisor at the University of Göttingen. Walfisz lived in Wiesbaden from 1922 through 1927, then he returned to Warsaw, worked at an insurance company and at the mathematical institute of the university (habilitation in 1930). In 1936, Walfisz became professor at the University of Tbilisi in the nation of Georgia (at the time a part of the Soviet Union). He wrote approximately 100 mathematical articles and three books.

Work 
By using a theorem by Carl Ludwig Siegel providing an upper bound for the real zeros (see Siegel zero) of Dirichlet L-functions formed with real non-principal characters, Walfisz obtained the Siegel–Walfisz theorem, from which the prime number theorem for arithmetic progressions can be deduced.

Works 
Pell's equation (in Russian), Tbilisi, 1952
Gitterpunkte in mehrdimensionalen Kugeln [Lattice points in multi-dimensional spheres], Panstwowe Wydawnictwo Naukowe, Monografi Matematyczne, vol. 33. Warszawa, 1957, online
Weylsche Exponentialsummen in der neueren Zahlentheorie [Weyl exponential sums in the newer number theory], VEB Deutscher Verlag der Wissenschaften, Berlin, 1963.

Further reading 
 Ekkehard Krätzel, Christoph Lamm: Von Wiesbaden nach Tiflis – Die wechselvolle Lebensgeschichte des Zahlentheoretikers Arnold Walfisz [From Wiesbaden to Tiflis: The eventful life story of number-theorist Arnold Walfisz] (German), Mitteilungen der Deutschen Mathematiker-Vereinigung, Band 21 (1), 2013
 Sophie Goetzel-Leviathan (née Walfisz): Der Krieg von Innen (German), Paul Lazarus Stiftung, Wiesbaden, 2011

References

External links 

Short biography and list of works
Biography from Acta Arithmetica, 1964
Description of his work from Acta Arithmetica, 1964

1892 births
1962 deaths
19th-century Polish Jews
Number theorists
20th-century Polish mathematicians
Scientists from Warsaw
Academic staff of Tbilisi State University
Polish emigrants to the Soviet Union